Juan Ángel Aichino (19 May 1928 – 23 December 2004) was an Argentine rower. He competed in the men's eight event at the 1948 Summer Olympics.

References

External links
 

1928 births
2004 deaths
Argentine male rowers
Olympic rowers of Argentina
Rowers at the 1948 Summer Olympics
Pan American Games medalists in rowing
Pan American Games gold medalists for Argentina
Rowers at the 1951 Pan American Games